Resolution is a 2012 American horror film directed by Justin Benson and Aaron Scott Moorhead, written by Benson, and starring Peter Cilella and Vinny Curran. Cilella plays a graphic designer and father-to-be named Michael who, after receiving a troubling email video of his drug-addicted best friend Chris (played by Curran), travels to a remote cabin to save him. The 2017 film The Endless shares the same creative universe as Resolution, and may be interpreted as a partial sequel.

Plot 

Michael Danube, a graphic designer living in the city with his pregnant wife, receives an email containing a video of Chris Daniels, his best friend. Chris, a drug addict, has retreated to a remote rural area and has become delusional and erratic. A map is included with the video. Despite his wife's objections, Michael makes one last attempt to save Chris. He promises to return after one week and follows the map.

At his destination, Michael hears Chris ranting and shooting a pistol. Chris invites Michael in and starts ranting about various subjects. When Chris refuses to go into rehab, Michael subdues him with a stun gun, handcuffs him, and says that he will make Chris go cold turkey to get sober. In the morning, Michael staves off an attempted attack from Chris.

Later, Micah and Billy, Michael and Chris' old acquaintances, arrive and ask for drugs that Chris is holding. After Michael drives them off, Chris warns against messing with them, as they have become violent and unpredictable. As he takes a walk, Michael meets members of a UFO religion, then returns to the house and finds a set of strange photographs. Micah and Billy return, but Charles, a tribal security guard chases them off. Charles tells Michael that Chris is squatting on reservation land, but accepts Michael's bribe in exchange for letting them stay for five days.

After they discover disturbing film footage, Chris denies sending any emails or videos. Michael finds a book full of campfire stories on their doorstep, and, when he returns the book to the library, finds film slides in its place. Confused by the items that seem purposefully left for them to find, Michael suggests that it is a prank by Billy and Micah, which Chris dismisses.

Michael continues to find clues strewn about the area. When he bribes Charles for information, Charles warns him against digging into the past, only saying French students used the area for research. They encounter a con artist who offers to buy the house and leaves after Michael says that they are only "renting." Michael re-watches the video he received in the e-mail and finds it has changed, it now shows an argument that Michael and Chris had moments before. Billy and Micah return and kill a dog that Chris had adopted, and Chris reveals that he is suicidal.

Michael tracks down the dog's original owner, an archeologist named Byron, a member of the original French research team. Byron, who smokes a hallucinogenic drug that is red in colour, suggests that the two other students researchers were looking for monsters and found themselves. Byron believes the area is not haunted; instead, "something" there desires stories. While reflecting a small mirror into a large one, creating an infinity of reflections of himself and Michael, Byron stresses the need for a beginning, middle, and end. Unnerved by Byron's eccentricity, Michael leaves.

As more clues appear from nowhere, the film projector Michael has been using turns on and projects the gruesome deaths and funeral photos of himself and Chris. Michael's laptop plays a video depicting Micah and Billy beating them to death. The two flee the house, only to find a CD in Michael's that has a recording of Charles murdering them and burning down the house. Chris wants to leave the property immediately; Michael, however, does not want to bring the curse home and wants to appease the entity instead. Upon returning to the house, they witness Charles and a companion from the reservation killing Micah and Billy before setting the house on fire. Chris and Michael panic; Chris breaks down and finally agrees to go to rehab.  Their joy over achieving a happy ending to their story is abruptly cut short when the entity angrily confronts them. Chris kneels before it and apologizes profusely, and Michael asks the entity if they can try again.The creature roars in response.

Cast 
 Peter Cilella as Michael Danube
 Vinny Curran as Chris Daniels
 Zahn McClarnon as Charles
 Bill Oberst Jr. as Byron
 Kurt David Anderson as Billy
 Skyler Meacham as Micah
 Justin Benson as Justin, UFO Cult Member
 Aaron Scott Moorhead as Aaron, UFO Cult Member

Production 
Although the film is often described as "genre-bending", this was not an intentional concept; it was always meant as a horror film about an unseen antagonist that manipulates reality to create interesting stories.  The detox plotline was introduced to give the story more structure, as the directors needed a plot device to have the story unfold over seven days.  The script was written in six months.  The main parts of the film were shot in 17 days, but the side plots were shot over the course of several months on weekends.  The directors were specifically interested in avoiding overt homage, and, instead, focused on parodying independent film tropes.  The film was shot in East County, San Diego.  The directors have no direct experience with detox; to perform research, they searched Google for information.  Benson was acquainted with a crack addict, however, and he used some of the addict's ramblings as inspiration for Chris' dialog.

Release 
Resolution had its world premiere at the Tribeca Film Festival April 20, 2012.  Tribeca Film gave the film an initial limited theatrical release on January 25, 2013.  Cinedigm and Tribeca Film released Resolution on DVD, Blu-ray, and video-on-demand October 8, 2013.

Reception

Reviews
Rotten Tomatoes, a review aggregator, reports that Resolution received positive reviews from 80% of 15 critics surveyed. Metacritic scored it 80/100 based on 5 reviews, which indicates "generally favorable reviews".  Mark Adams of Screen Daily called it "a clever, twisted and very impressive slow-burner of a chiller".  Rod Lott of the Oklahoma Gazette called it suspenseful and singled out the last 20 minutes as "seriously unnerving."  Jason Jenkins of Dread Central rated the film 4.5/5 stars and wrote, "With its great cast, unique concept, and its sharply written script, Resolution is one of the very best films I’ve seen this year."  Peter Gutierrez of Twitch Film said that the film has a "quietly mythic power" and takes many big risks that pay off.  Adam Tyner of DVD Talk rated the film 5/5 stars and wrote, "There's a sense of unease that pervades almost every frame in Resolution, and a key part of it is not knowing what's lurking around the next bend. This is what horror movies are supposed to do, but it hardly ever really works in practice. Resolution not only nails it, but it does so without leaning on any jump scares, stings in the score, or cheap gore as a crutch."

Michael Nazarewycz of DVD Verdict said that Resolution is "a very good film" that gives new life to old tropes.  Dennis Harvey of Variety wrote, "There are long buildups, and then there's Resolution, a movie that's virtually all nothing-much-happening setup until a still-teasing titular event that occupies just a few final seconds."  Lonnie Nadler of Bloody Disgusting rated the film 4/5 stars and wrote that it "delivers a dashingly intelligent commentary on the horror genre, the nature of cinema, and the relationship viewers have to on-screen victims."  Serena Whitney of Dread Central rated the film 5/5 stars and called it "a remarkable achievement" and "an inventive, character-based story" that "provides be the breath of fresh air the genre sorely needs".  Robert Abele of the Los Angeles Times wrote that it offers "a strangely tense and humorous meta-narrative" that "manages to keep its eerier moments surprising and its emotional life arresting."

Many reviews compared it to The Cabin in the Woods.  SFX rated it 3.5/5 stars and described it as "clever, creepy meta-horror" that is like a lo-fi version of The Cabin in the Woods.  Kurt Halfyard of Twitch Film wrote, "Unlike the smug, offhand silliness of Joss Whedon and Drew Goddard's Cabin in the Woods, this one makes you give a damn; as much about the films building Lost-type puzzlebox, but moreso the two exceptionally well realized characters."  Scott Weinberg of Fearnet called the film "a smart and subversive take" that is less entertaining than Cabin in the Woods.  Nick Schager of The Village Voice wrote that it puts Cabin in the Woods "to shame on a fraction of the budget".  Ian Buckwalter of NPR wrote, "Resolution is really a less self-conscious cousin to last year's Cabin in the Woods; both are hugely satisfying exercises in examining the way in which stories are told."  Scott Tobias of The A.V. Club rated it B and called it "an indie analog to The Cabin In The Woods" that "gets further in its conceit than its execution".

Awards 
At Macabro 2013, the directors were awarded Best Director.  At the Toronto After Dark Film Festival, the film won four awards, including best screenplay and most innovative film.  The directors won Best Director at the 2013 Fantastic Planet film festival.

References

External links 
 
 

2012 films
2012 horror films
2012 horror thriller films
American independent films
American horror thriller films
American supernatural horror films
American supernatural thriller films
American haunted house films
Films shot in San Diego
Films directed by Aaron Moorhead
Films directed by Justin Benson
American monster movies
2010s English-language films
2010s American films